The 1992 edition of the Campeonato Carioca kicked off on August 1, 1992 and ended on December 20, 1992. It is the official tournament organized by FFERJ (Federação de Futebol do Estado do Rio de Janeiro, or Rio de Janeiro State Football Federation. Only clubs based in the Rio de Janeiro State are allowed to play. Twenty-six teams contested this edition. Vasco da Gama won the title for the 18th time. Barra Mansa, AA Cabofriense, Paduano and União Nacional were relegated.

System
The tournament would be divided in three stages:
 Taça Guanabara: The twenty-six teams were divided into two groups; Group A, with twelve teams, and Group B, with fourteen. each team played in a single round-robin format against the teams of their group. The champion of Group A qualified to the Finals. The top two teams of Group B were promoted to Group A. 
 Taça Rio: The disposition of the groups now was inversed, with Group A having fourteen teams and Group B twelve. each team all played in a single round-robin format against the teams of their group. The champion of Group A qualified to the Finals. The four bottom teams of Group A would be relegated to Group B for 1992's Taça Guanabara. In Group B, the top two teams were promoted to Group A and the bottom four teams were relegated to the Second Level.
 Finals: They would be disputed by the campions of Taça Guanabara and Taça Rio. if the same team won both of them, they wouldn't be held.

Championship

Taça Guanabara

Group A

Group B

Taça Rio

Group A

Group B

References

Campeonato Carioca seasons
Carioca